Sex with an X is the second studio album by the Scottish alternative rock band The Vaselines, which was released on 14 September 2010 on Sub Pop. It was their first new album since the release of Dum-Dum over 20 years earlier.

The first single from the album, "I Hate The 80s" was released on 10 June 2010. The second single, the title track "Sex with an X", was released on 24 August 2010 with the B-side; "Roaster", while the third single "Mouth To Mouth" was released on Valentine's Day, 14 February 2011.

On 9 September 2010, guardian.co.uk streamed the entire album on its Music Blog.  The album was released with a track by track guide written by The Vaselines.

The final track, "Exit the Vaselines", is a reference to the compilation album, Enter the Vaselines.

Track listing
All tracks written and composed by Eugene Kelly/Frances McKee
  "Ruined" – 2:11
  "Sex with an X" – 3:34
  "The Devil's Inside Me" – 4:34
  "Such A Fool" – 2:56
  "Turning It On" – 3:37
  "Overweight But Over You" – 3:05
  "Poison Pen" – 4:18
  "I Hate The 80s" – 3:29
  "Mouth To Mouth" – 3:35
  "Whitechapel" – 3:31
  "My God's Bigger Than Your God" – 2:51
  "Exit The Vaselines" – 4:36
  "Picked A Cherry" (iTunes Bonus Track) – 2:54

Personnel
The Vaselines
Eugene Kelly – Guitar/Vocals
Frances McKee – Guitar/Vocals
Stevie Jackson – Guitar
Bobby Kildea – Bass
Michael McGaughrin – Drums
Produced by Jamie Watson.
Recorded by Julie McLarnon

References

External links
3. Amazon.com

2010 albums
Sub Pop albums
The Vaselines albums